JRB may refer to:

 Downtown Manhattan Heliport (IATA code: JRB), Lower Manhattan, New York City, New York, U.S.
 ISO 639:jrb or Judeo-Arabic languages, a continuum of specifically Jewish varieties of Arabic
 James River Bridge, the James River Bridge in Newport News, Virginia
 Jatiya Rakkhi Bahini, a Bangladeshi para-military force
 Joseph Robinette Biden Jr., current President of the United States, former U.S. Vice President and former U.S. Senator.
 Juvenile Review Board, reviews juvenile court cases, Connecticut, U.S.